The River Road Historic District is a U.S. historic district (designated as such on July 15, 1998) located in Orange Park, Florida. The district is at the junction of River Road and Stiles Avenue. It contains ten historic buildings.

References

External links
 Clay County listings at National Register of Historic Places

National Register of Historic Places in Clay County, Florida
Historic districts on the National Register of Historic Places in Florida